In numerical analysis, Hermite interpolation, named after Charles Hermite, is a method of polynomial interpolation, which generalizes Lagrange interpolation. Lagrange interpolation allows computing a polynomial of degree less than  that takes the same value at  given points as a given function. Instead, Hermite interpolation computes a polynomial of degree less than  such that the polynomial and its  first derivatives have the same values at  given points as a given function and its  first derivatives.

Hermite's method of interpolation is closely related to the Newton's interpolation method, in that both are derived from the calculation of divided differences. However, there are other methods for computing a Hermite interpolating polynomial. One can use linear algebra, by taking the coefficients of the interpolating polynomial as unknowns, and writing as linear equations the constraints that the interpolating polynomial must satisfy. For another method, see .

Statement of the problem

Hermite interpolation consists of computing a polynomial of degree as low as possible that  matches an unknown function both in observed value, and the observed value of its first  derivatives. This means that  values

must be known. In this case the resulting polynomial has a degree less than the number of data points.)

Then, by writing the constraints that the interpolating polynomial must satisfy, one gets a system of  linear equations in  unknowns. 

In general, such a system has exactly one solution.

Method

Simple case 
When using divided differences to calculate the Hermite polynomial of a function f, the first step is to copy each point m times. (Here we will consider the simplest case  for all points.)

such that

Now, we create a divided differences table for the points . However, for some divided differences,

which is undefined.
All others are calculated normally.

General case 
In the general case, suppose a given point  has k derivatives. When creating the table, divided differences of  identical values will be calculated as

For example,

etc.

Example 
Consider the function .
{| class="wikitable" style="text-align: right; padding: 1em;"
|-
! x  || ƒ(x) || ƒ'(x)  || ƒ''(x)
|-
| −1 ||  2   ||  −8     || 56
|-
| 0  ||  1   ||  0     || 0
|-
| 1  ||  2   ||  8    || 56
|}

Since we have two derivatives to work with, we construct the set . Our divided difference table is then:

and the generated polynomial is

Quintic Hermite interpolation 
The quintic Hermite interpolation based on the function, its first and second derivatives at two different points ( and ) can be used for example to interpolate the position of an object based on its position, velocity and acceleration.
The general form is given by

Error
Call the calculated polynomial H and original function f. Evaluating a point , the error function is
 

See also
Cubic Hermite spline
Newton series, also known as finite differences
Neville's schema
Bernstein form of the interpolation polynomial

References

External links
Hermites Interpolating Polynomial at Mathworld

Interpolation
Finite differences
Factorial and binomial topics